Oliver Hughes may refer to:

 Oliver Hughes (banker) (born 1970), Russian entrepreneur and financier
 Oliver Hughes (soldier) (1844–1911), Medal of Honor recipient